"Emma" is a song by Australian band Little River Band, released in December 1975 as the second single from the group's self-titled studio album. The song peaked at number 20 on the Australian Kent Music Report singles chart.

Track listings
7" (EMI 11003)
Side A. "Emma" - 3:19
Side B. "Love Is a Feeling" - 4:40

Charts

References 

1975 singles
1975 songs
Little River Band songs
EMI Records singles